Cat grass is any grass that is grown specifically for cats, usually indoors. It may be grown in a dish from which the cat chews the grass directly, or just added to cat food. The most common stated benefit is to aid the passing of hairballs.

The most common species sold for this purpose is Oatgrass (Arrhenatherum elatius); other suitable species often mentioned are Barleygrass (Hordeum vulgare), Wheatgrass (Triticum aestivum), Intermediate Wheatgrass (Thinopyrum intermedium) and Ryegrass (Lolium perenne), occasionally Orchard grass (Dactylis glomerata).

References

Cat health
Grasses